Ella Cinders is a 1926 American silent comedy film directed by Alfred E. Green, starring Colleen Moore, produced by her husband John McCormick, and featuring Moore's recurring co-star (five films in three years), Lloyd Hughes. The film is based on the syndicated comic strip of the same name by William M. Conselman and Charles Plumb, which in turn was based upon the millennia-old folk tale of Cinderella.

In 2013, Ella Cinders was selected for preservation in the United States National Film Registry by the Library of Congress as being "culturally, historically, or aesthetically significant".

The film has entered the public domain in the United States.

Plot
In the house of late father in the town of Roseville, Ella Cinders works for her shrewish stepmother Ma and two stepsisters, Prissy Pill and Lotta Pill, who are beloved in the town but abusive toward Ella. She finds support from the local iceman, Waite Lifter. The Gem Film Company has a contest in which the winner gets an all-expense-paid trip to Hollywood and a film role. Stealing an acting book from Lotta, she works on facial expressions. A photograph is needed to enter, so Ella spends three nights babysitting to raise $3 for the photo session.

The photographer unwittingly takes a picture of her looking cross-eyed at a fly on her nose which turns out to be the photo entered in the contest. Entrants must go to a Town Hall ball, but Ella's stepmother and stepsisters won't allow her to go. Waite sees her crying on the front steps and tells her he will take her to the ball. She says she has nothing to wear, so he convinces her to use one of her stepsisters' dresses. At the judges' table, her stepsisters react violently when they see the dress. The embarrassed Ella flees the ball, losing one of her slippers. She heads for an employment agency hoping for a new start, only to be placed right back with Ma, who vows to punish her severely.

Later, the judges come to the house and tell Ella that she is the winner because they were amused by the cross-eyed photo and were looking at someone capable of comedy (much to Ella's disappointment at first, and Ma's fury). Ella heads for Hollywood, where she is disappointed to discover the contest was a fraud. Fearing what would happen if she tried to return to Roseville, she decides to stay in Hollywood and break into the industry as an actress the hard way; after substantial rejection and failed attempts to literally break into a studio lot, she succeeds, landing a contract to play the lead role in a rags-to-riches story similar to her own life.

Waite turns out to be football hero and wealthy heir George Waite, who runs to Hollywood, sweeps Ella off her feet on the set, and marries her. The two have a child and live happily ever after.

Cast

Production background
Portions of the film take place on the sets of a movie studio, and so many regulars at First National Studios appear in the film. The film's director, Alfred E. Green, appears in the film as the director of the film being shot as Ella runs through the studio. Harry Langdon also makes a cameo in the film as a famous film comedian.

The character of George Waite/Waite Lifter was a parody of real-life football star Red Grange, who likewise played at the University of Illinois and worked as an iceman during the offseason.

This was the last time that Moore and Hughes starred together in a film, having previously played the leads in The Huntress (1923), Sally (1925), The Desert Flower (1925) and Irene (1926).

Status and home media
Copies of Ella Cinders are preserved at the UCLA Film and Television Archive and the Library of Congress.

Ella Cinders is currently held in the public domain. It has since been released on DVD by  Sunrise Silents, Reel Classic DVD, Reel Classic DVD, and Grapevine Video.

References

External links

 
 
 

1926 films
1926 comedy-drama films
American silent feature films
American black-and-white films
Films about Hollywood, Los Angeles
Films based on Charles Perrault's Cinderella
Films based on comic strips
Films directed by Alfred E. Green
First National Pictures films
Films set in Los Angeles
United States National Film Registry films
Films about beauty pageants
1920s English-language films
1920s American films
Silent American comedy-drama films
English-language comedy-drama films